The Eastern Kentucky Coalfield is part of the Central Appalachian bituminous coalfield, including all or parts of 30 Kentucky counties and adjoining areas in Ohio, West Virginia, Virginia and Tennessee. It covers an area from the Allegheny Mountains in the east across the Cumberland Plateau to the Pottsville Escarpment in the west.  The region is known for its coal mining; most family farms in the region have disappeared since the introduction of surface mining in the 1940s and 1950s.

The Daniel Boone National Forest is located on rough but beautiful terrain along and east of the Pottsville Escarpment. There are many natural arches and sandstone cliffs that are excellent for rock climbing and rappeling. The Red River Gorge, part of the National Forest, is known worldwide in rock climbing circles.

During the American Civil War most of this region leaned toward the Union due to its makeup at the time of mostly small farmers, but more than 2,000 men from this area formed the 5th. Kentucky Vol. Inf., known as the Army of Eastern Kentucky, under Gen. Humphrey Marshall, C.S.A. During the Great Depression, New Deal programs and the organizing of the United Mine Workers of America made many of the eastern counties Democratic.

Eastern Kentucky has a rich musical heritage. Many nationally acclaimed country music singers and musicians are from the area. These include: Loretta Lynn, Crystal Gayle, The Judds, Ricky Skaggs, Keith Whitley, Patty Loveless, Dwight Yoakam, Tom T. Hall, Billy Ray Cyrus, Jean Ritchie, Sturgill Simpson, Tyler Childers, Chris Stapleton, and George S. Davis.

As of the 1980s, the only counties in the United States where over half of the population cited "English" as their only ancestry group were in the hills of eastern Kentucky (and made up nearly every county in this region).  In the 1980 census, 1,267,079 Kentuckians out of a total population of 2,554,359 cited that they were of English ancestry, making them 49 percent of the state at that time. Large numbers of people of Scottish and Irish ancestry settled the area as well.

Geography
The Eastern Kentucky Coalfield covers 31 counties with a combined land area of 13,370 sq mi (34,628 km2), or about 33.1 percent of the state's land area. Its 2000 census population was 734,194 inhabitants, or about 18.2 percent of the state's population. The largest city, Ashland, has a population of 21,981. Other cities of significance in the region include Pikeville, London, and Middlesboro. The state's highest point, Black Mountain, is located in the southeastern part of the region in Harlan County.

Counties

|}

Major cities

The following list consists of Eastern Kentucky cities with populations over 4,000 according to the 2020 United States Census:

Protected areas

Historical parks

Cumberland Gap National Historical Park (part)
Dr. Thomas Walker State Historic Site

State resort parks

Buckhorn Lake State Resort Park
Carter Caves State Resort Park
Cumberland Falls State Resort Park
Greenbo Lake State Resort Park
Jenny Wiley State Resort Park
Natural Bridge State Resort Park
Pine Mountain State Resort Park

State recreational parks

Carr Creek State Park
Dawkins Line Rail Trail
Fishtrap Lake State Park
Grayson Lake State Park
Kingdom Come State Park
Levi Jackson Wilderness Road State Park
Paintsville Lake State Park
Pine Mountain State Scenic Trail
Yatesville Lake State Park

Other

Big South Fork National River and Recreation Area (part)
Breaks Interstate Park (part)

Economy

The region's economy is centered around the natural resources available, which includes coal, timber, natural gas, and oil. Recently, tourism has become a leading industry in the region, due to the region's cultural history and the creation of state parks.

Calgon Carbon constructed the Big Sandy Plant near Ashland in 1961 and it has since become the world's largest producer of granular activated carbon. The facility produces over 100 million pounds of granular activated carbon annually.

Persistent poverty
Most of the counties in the Eastern Kentucky Coalfield are classified as "persistent poverty counties". The definition of a persistent poverty county by the Economic Research Service of the United States Department of Agriculture is that 20 percent or more of the total county population has been living in poverty since the 1980 census.

A June 2014 article in The New York Times identified six counties in the Kentucky Coal Field as among the "hardest places to live in the United States."  The lowest-ranking counties were Breathitt, Clay, Jackson, Lee, Leslie, and Magoffin. They ranked among the bottom ten counties nationwide. The factors which accounted for the low ranking of those six counties were unemployment, prevalence of disabilities, obesity, income, and education. The Times declared Clay County the hardest place to live in the U.S.

Appalachian Regional Commission

The Appalachian Regional Commission was formed in 1965 to aid economic development in the Appalachian region, which was lagging far behind the rest of the nation on most economic indicators. The Appalachian region currently defined by the Commission includes 420 counties in 13 states, including all counties in Kentucky's Eastern Coalfield.  The Commission gives each county one of five possible economic designations—distressed, at-risk, transitional, competitive, or attainment—with "distressed" counties being the most economically endangered and "attainment" counties being the most economically prosperous.  These designations are based primarily on three indicators—three-year average unemployment rate, market income per capita, and poverty rate.

From 2012 to 2014, "Appalachian" Kentucky—which includes all of the Eastern Coalfield and several counties in South Central Kentucky and a few in the eastern part of the Bluegrass region—had a three-year average unemployment rate of 9.8%, compared with 7.6% statewide and 7.2% nationwide. In 2014, Appalachian Kentucky had a per capita market income of $18,889, compared with $28,332 statewide and $38,117 nationwide. From 2010 to 2014, Appalachian Kentucky had an average poverty rate of 25.4%—the highest of any of the ARC regions—, compared to 18.9% statewide and 15.6% nationwide. Twenty-five Eastern Mountain Coal Field counties—Bell, Breathitt, Carter, Clay, Elliott, Floyd, Harlan, Jackson, Johnson, Knott, Knox, Lawrence, Lee, Leslie, Letcher, Magoffin, Martin, McCreary, Menifee, Morgan, Owsley, Powell, Rowan, Whitley, and Wolfe—were designated "distressed," while four – Laurel, Montgomery, Perry, and Pike – were designated "at-risk." Two Eastern Coalfield counties were designated "transitional" — Boyd and Greenup. No counties in the Eastern Coalfields region were given the "attainment" designation or were designated "competitive."

The following table illustrates the economic status of each county.

Health

Most of the counties in the Eastern Kentucky Coalfield rank in the lowest ten percent of U.S. counties in average life expectancy. Both men and women have average life spans that are several years less than the average life span in the United States. Moreover, many counties have seen a decline in the life expectancy of men and/or women since 1985.  Factors influencing the health of residents include a high prevalence of smoking and obesity and a low level of physical activity.

Post-secondary education

Public universities

Morehead State University

Private colleges and universities

Alice Lloyd College
Clear Creek Baptist Bible College
Frontier Nursing University
Kentucky Christian University
Kentucky Mountain Bible College
University of Pikeville
Union College
University of the Cumberlands

Community and technical colleges
Ashland Community and Technical College
Big Sandy Community and Technical College
Hazard Community and Technical College
Southeast Kentucky Community and Technical College

Political climate
As a whole, East Kentucky was long a Democratic stronghold. The only two counties in the state to vote against Mitch McConnell in each of his six senatorial campaigns through 2020 have been Wolfe and Elliott Counties, both in East Kentucky. However, the region has swung dramatically to the right recently. In 2004, eleven counties in East Kentucky supported Democratic candidate John F. Kerry, and in 2008, even as the nation as a whole shifted Democratic, the number of East Kentucky counties supporting Democratic candidate Barack Obama fell to just four, and in 2012 fell to just one. Every county in East Kentucky supported Donald Trump in both 2016 and 2020 with at least 50% of the vote. In fact, each of the three most Republican counties in Kentucky (in terms of vote proportion) were all in East Kentucky (namely Leslie, Jackson and Martin Counties). Each gave less than a tenth of their vote to Hillary Clinton, the Democratic candidate.

Elliott County, Kentucky, serves as a good representation of the political transformation throughout the region. It had the longest streak in the nation of any county to vote Democratic. It has in recent years, however, shifted hard to the right, just like the rest of East Kentucky. In 2008 Elliott County was the most Democratic county in the state, giving over 60% of the vote to Barack Obama. In 2012, however, it supported him by a margin of just three percentage points (the lowest percentage for a Democrat in county history) and lost the title of most Democratic in the state to Jefferson County, home to Louisville, the most populous city in the state. And by 2016, it supported Donald Trump with over 70% of the county vote, and 75% four years later. In local elections (like East Kentucky), though it has trended more Republican, it still remains a Democratic stronghold. In the State Senate election, it gave Democrat Rocky Adkins 86% of the vote. As of November 2012, just 4.2% of registered voters were Republicans, the lowest proportion for any county in the state. By October 2016, this proportion had more than doubled (to 8.2%), and by April 2019 it stood at 10.6%. Indeed, Elliott County voters, just like most East Kentucky voters, are socially conservative and economically more liberal. Much of this area is represented by Kentucky's 5th congressional district represented by 22-term congressman Hal Rogers, he also serves as the Dean of the United States House of Representatives

Notable residents

Hylo Brown, bluegrass and country music singer, born in River.
June Buchanan (1887–1988), educator who worked with Alice Spencer Geddes Lloyd (see below). Co-founder of Caney Junior College, now Alice Lloyd College. Lived in Knott County from 1919 until her death.
Tyler Childers, a country, bluegrass, and folk musician from Paintsville, Kentucky. 
Earle Combs (1899–1976), Hall of Fame MLB center fielder for the New York Yankees.  Born in Pebworth, a community in Owsley County.
Tim Couch, former NFL quarterback. Born and raised in Hyden.
Billy Ray Cyrus (born 1961), American country music singer, songwriter and actor. Born in Flatwoods.
Richie Farmer (born 1969), basketball standout for the University of Kentucky and politician (Kentucky Commissioner of Agriculture, 2003–2011). Born and raised in Manchester.
Jim Ford, singer-songwriter, born in Johnson County.
Mary Elliott Flanery, first woman elected to a state legislature south of the Mason–Dixon line.
Crystal Gayle, country singer and younger sister of Loretta Lynn; both raised in Van Lear.
Eula Hall, Founder of the Mud Creek Clinic.
Roscoe Holcomb, American musician who lived the majority of his life in Daisy.
Silas House (born 1971), author. Born and raised in Laurel County; also lived in Leslie County during his childhood.
The Judds, a country music duo of mother Naomi (born 1946) and daughter Wynonna (born 1964). Born in Ashland.
Ashley Judd (born 1968), actress; daughter of Naomi Judd and half-sister of Wynonna Judd. Born in Ashland.
Alice Spencer Geddes Lloyd (1876–1962), social reformer who founded 100 elementary schools in the region as well as co-founding the college that now bears her name. Lived in Knott County from 1915 until her death.
Patty Loveless, country music singer. Born in Pikeville.
Loretta Lynn, country singer, raised in Van Lear.
John Pelphrey (born 1968), basketball standout for the University of Kentucky (and teammate of Farmer); former head basketball coach at the University of Arkansas, and current assistant at the University of Florida. Born in Paintsville.
Francis Gary Powers (August 17, 1929 – August 1, 1977) was an American pilot whose CIA U-2 spy plane was shot down while over the Soviet Union, causing the 1960 U-2 incident. Born in Jenkins.
Venus Ramey, Miss America, 1944. Born in Ashland.
Jeff Sheppard (born 1974), University of Kentucky basketball star (1998 NCAA Tournament Most Outstanding Player) and former player in the NBA and several European leagues. Has lived in London since he retired from play.
Benjamin F. Stapleton, Mayor of Denver, Colorado between (1923–1931) and (1935–1947). Born in Paintsville.
Gary Stewart, Country music singer and musician, 1944–2003, born in Jenkins.
Jesse Stuart, author and former poet laureate of Kentucky
Dwight Yoakam (born 1956), singer-songwriter, actor and film director. Born in Pikeville.
Sturgill Simpson, outlaw country music singer-songwriter born in Jackson in 1978

See also
Huntington-Ashland-Ironton metropolitan area
Coal mining in Kentucky

References

External links
Visit Eastern Kentucky
Shaping Our Appalachian Region (SOAR)

 
Mining in Kentucky
Coal mining in Appalachia
Coal mining regions in the United States
Geography of Appalachia
Regions of Kentucky